Nontapan Jeansatawong (born September 2, 1982) is a retired professional footballer from Thailand.
He played in the 2010 Thai League Cup final and won a winner's medal after Thai Port defeated Buriram PEA F.C. 2-1.

He played for Thailand at the 1999 FIFA World Youth Championship finals.

International goals

Honours

Club
TOT S.C.
 Thai Division 1 League Champions (1) : 2003

Thai Port F.C.
 Thai League Cup Winner (1) : 2010

References

External links

1982 births
Living people
Nontapan Jeansatawong
Nontapan Jeansatawong
Association football fullbacks
Nontapan Jeansatawong
Nontapan Jeansatawong
Nontapan Jeansatawong
Nontapan Jeansatawong
Nontapan Jeansatawong
Nontapan Jeansatawong
Nontapan Jeansatawong
Nontapan Jeansatawong
Nontapan Jeansatawong
Nontapan Jeansatawong
Nontapan Jeansatawong
Nontapan Jeansatawong
Nontapan Jeansatawong